Nolan Evans (1885–1948), sometimes known as Peggy Evans, was an English professional footballer who played in the Football League for Clapton Orient as a left back.

Personal life 
Evans worked as a miner. He served as a sergeant in the Football Battalion of the Middlesex Regiment during the First World War. Evans was wounded in the thigh at Delville Wood and nearly lost the leg as a result. He was wounded again in March 1918 and the effects caused his retirement from football.

Career statistics

References

1885 births
1948 deaths
People from Ashton-in-Makerfield
English footballers
English Football League players
Association football fullbacks
Brynn Central F.C. players
St Helens Recreation F.C. players
Exeter City F.C. players
Leyton Orient F.C. players
British Army personnel of World War I
Middlesex Regiment soldiers
Military personnel from Lancashire
Southern Football League players
English miners
Date of birth unknown
Date of death unknown